Juan Carlos Díaz (born February 19, 1974) is a retired Cuban professional baseball first baseman/designated hitter. Listed at 6' 2", 228 lb., Díaz batted and threw right-handed. He spent part of the 2002 season in Major League Baseball with the Boston Red Sox.

Díaz was a veteran of fourteen minor league seasons. He started his baseball career in 1997 with the Los Angeles Dodgers organization, playing for them two years before joining the Boston (2000–02), Baltimore (2003), Minnesota (2004), and St. Louis systems. In 2007, he played for the independent Joliet JackHammers of the Northern League. He split 2008 between the JackHammers and the Tecolotes de Nuevo Laredo of the Mexican League.

In four major league games with the Red Sox, Díaz posted a .286 batting average (two-for-seven) with one home run, two RBI, two runs, one double, a .375 OBP, and a .857 SLG.  His only home run came on June 23, when he hit a two-run shot off Dodgers pitcher Andy Ashby in a 9–6 loss, in what turned out to be the final at-bat of Diaz's major league career.

From 1997 through 2008, Díaz made 936 minor league appearances, hitting for a .301 average (999-for-3209) with 230 home runs and 719 RBI.

Diaz played the 2010 baseball season for the Winnipeg Goldeyes in the Northern League. On January 27, 2011, it was announced that he was released by Winnipeg. 2 months later, Diaz retired from baseball.

See also

List of baseball players who defected from Cuba
List of Major League Baseball players with a home run in their final major league at bat

References

External links

Retrosheet

1974 births
Living people
People from San José de las Lajas
Major League Baseball first basemen
Major League Baseball designated hitters
Boston Red Sox players
Savannah Sand Gnats players
Vero Beach Dodgers players
San Jose Missions players
Sarasota Red Sox players
Pawtucket Red Sox players
Trenton Thunder players
Bowie Baysox players
Rochester Red Wings players
Springfield Cardinals players
Memphis Redbirds players
Joliet JackHammers players
Tecolotes de Nuevo Laredo players
Winnipeg Goldeyes players
Major League Baseball players from Cuba
Cuban expatriate baseball players in the United States
Cuban expatriate baseball players in Mexico
Estrellas Orientales players
Cuban expatriate baseball players in the Dominican Republic
Cuban expatriate baseball players in Canada
Águilas de Mexicali players
Águilas del Zulia players
Cuban expatriate baseball players in Venezuela